The Los Angeles Web Series Festival, more commonly known as the LA Web Fest, is a web series festival based in Los Angeles, California. It was founded in 2009 by Michael Okwudili Ajakwe Jr and was one of the first web series-based events; Filmmaker Magazine called it "the granddaddy of all webfests." The event has attracted controversy for its policies.

Background 

The festival had its first official event in 2010. The venue has changed several times since its inception, with the 2015 festival being held at the Hilton Universal City Hotel in Universal City.

When asked about the importance of web series as a creative medium by Carolyn Handler Miller for her book Digital Storytelling: A Creator's Guide to Interactive Entertainment, founder Michael Ajakwe, Jr. said:  Before, filmmaking was a rich man's game. And if you couldn't afford to make a film, a great voice might be lost ... Web series offer freedom.Since the festival's inaugural presentation in 2010, it has helped produce web series-based festivals in several major cities around the world, including in Marseille (Marseille Web Fest), Melbourne (Melbourne Web Fest), Rio (Rio Web Fest) and Seoul (Seoul Web Fest).

Controversy 
In 2015, after other LA-based web series festivals scheduled their events around the same time (including the HollyWeb Festival and Indie Series Awards), Ajakwe came under fire for enforcing an 'exclusivity clause' stating that all entrants "must withdraw their shows from HollyWeb Fest and their award consideration at the ISAs, or be disqualified from LA WebFest."

The clause has since been the subject of controversy and derision in the web series community, with many calling it "anticompetitive" and "unreasonable." Ajakwe spoke to Snobby Robot about the issue, claiming it stems from earlier conflicts in 2012 when the Hollywood Web Series Festival planned their festival on the same weekend as the LA Web Fest.

The Daily Dot also published a story about the controversy, writing: "The battle lines are drawn in the emerging web fest world, as the venerable LA Web Fest has drawn an exclusivity line in the sand for its 2015 entrants."

Award categories 
 Outstanding Comedy Series
 Outstanding Writing (Comedy)
 Outstanding Directing (Comedy)
 Outstanding Female Performance (Comedy)
 Outstanding Male Performance (Comedy)
 Outstanding Ensemble Performance (Comedy)
 Outstanding Drama Series
 Outstanding Writing (Drama)
 Outstanding Directing (Drama)
 Outstanding Female Performance (Drama)
 Outstanding Male Performance (Drama)
 Outstanding Ensemble Performance (Drama)
 Outstanding Action Series
 Outstanding Writing (Action)
 Outstanding Directing (Action)
 Outstanding Ensemble Performance (Action)
 Outstanding Animated Series
 Outstanding Music Video
 Outstanding Documentary Series
 Outstanding Variety Series
 Outstanding Educational Series
 Outstanding Directing (Non Fiction)
 Outstanding Writing (Non Fiction)
 Outstanding Cinematography
 Outstanding Editing
 Outstanding Costume Design
 Outstanding Production Design
 Outstanding Makeup
 Outstanding Soundtrack
 Outstanding Special FX
 Outstanding Sound Editing

See also

 Web television
 List of Web television series
 Web series

References

External links
 

Awards established in 2009
Web series awards
2009 establishments in California
Festivals established in 2009